Sambucus palmensis is a species of shrub or small tree in the family Adoxaceae. It is endemic to the Canary Islands and is present in the laurel forest. It can reach 6 m tall and yields blackish berries.

References

palmensis
Flora of the Canary Islands
Flora of Spain
Plants described in 1828